= Mission Selfie =

Television series

Mission Selfie was a BBC Three reality travel series, starring Ben Brown and Steve Booker. The hosts' goal was to "take a photograph that sums up the experience." Filming locations included Dubai, Isle of Mull, Iceland, Berlin and El Hiero. Episodes ranged from 13 to 17 minutes in length. The series premiered on BBC iPlayer on 19 August 2016.
